The Battle of Hodów was a battle between the Kingdom of Poland and Crimean Khanate forces, fought in June 1694 in the Ruthenian Voivodeship of the Crown of the Kingdom of Poland, near the village of Hodów (now in Ternopil Raion, Ternopil Oblast, Ukraine). Often it is called the Polish Thermopylae, like the Battle of Wizna.

Prelude 
In June 1694, Tatar Muslim forces raided Polish territory with the intention of pillaging the countryside for loot and capturing prisoners for ransom. The Polish forces sent to stop them consisted of seven banners of hussars and pancerni from the Trenches of the Holy Trinity (Okopy Świętej Trójcy) and The Redoubt of Virgin Mary (Szaniec Panny Marii) strongholds, approximately 400 men in total; historian Mirosław Nagielski estimates 100 hussars and 300 pancerni. Tatar numbers were estimated at 25,000 to 70,000, with 40,000 being the most commonly quoted figure. John III Sobieski, the king of Poland at the time, also mentioned the figure of 40,000.

Battle 
The first encounter took place on the fields near Hodów. The 400-strong Polish cavalry charged the 700-strong Tatar vanguard and made them withdraw. Shortly afterwards the Polish forces retreated to Hodów due to overwhelming enemy numbers, and proceeded to fortify themselves using heavy wooden fences left there from earlier Tatar invasions. For the next 6 hours Polish troops resisted relentless Tatar attacks. Even after the Poles ran out of bullets, they continued to fire at the enemy, using Tatar arrowheads as improvised ammunition for their guns.

Unable to defeat the Poles, the Tatars sent Polish-speaking Lipka Tatars to convince the Polish troops to surrender. When the Polish commander replied "Come and get us if you can", the Tatars withdrew to Kamieniec Podolski and gave up on the entire raid, having gained nearly nothing despite large troop losses and vast numerical advantage.

Aftermath 
King John III Sobieski made use of the outstanding victory to raise army morale and paid generous compensation to those who lost their horses, financed treatment of wounded and rewarded those who captured enemy soldiers. In 1695, he also commissioned a statue commemorating the battle. The monument survived into modern times, was renewed in the summer of 2014 and was officially unveiled during the celebration of 320th anniversary of the battle on 25 October 2014.

See also 
 Magnate wars in Moldavia

References

External links 

 http://www.konflikty.pl/a,4291,Wczesna_nowozytnosc,Polskie_Termopile_1694._Bitwa_pod_Hodowem.html with additional references
Winged Hussars, Radoslaw Sikora, Bartosz Musialowicz, Business Ukraine Magazine, October 2016.

Hodow 1694
Hodow 1694
History of Moldavia (1504–1711)
Hodów